Cyttarophyllopsis is a genus of fungi in the Bolbitiaceae family of mushrooms. This is a monotypic genus, containing the single species Cyttarophyllopsis cordispora.

References

External links
 Cyttarophyllopsis at Index Fungorum

Bolbitiaceae
Monotypic Agaricales genera